KSRP may refer to:

 KSRP (FM), a radio station in Dodge City, Kansas, United States
 KHSRP, a gene also known as KSRP